In complex analysis, Mittag-Leffler's theorem concerns the existence of meromorphic functions with prescribed poles. Conversely, it can be used to express any meromorphic function as a sum of partial fractions. It is sister to the Weierstrass factorization theorem, which asserts existence of holomorphic functions with prescribed zeros.

The theorem is named after the Swedish mathematician Gösta Mittag-Leffler who published versions of the theorem in 1876 and 1884.

Theorem

Proof sketch
One possible proof outline is as follows. If  is finite, it suffices to take .

Example

Suppose that we desire a meromorphic function with simple poles of residue 1 at all positive integers. With notation as above, letting 
 
More constructively we can let 

Pole expansions of meromorphic functions 
Here are some examples of pole expansions of meromorphic functions:

See also 
 Riemann–Roch theorem
 Liouville's theorem
 Mittag-Leffler condition of an inverse limit
 Mittag-Leffler summation
 Mittag-Leffler function

References

.
.

External links
 

Theorems in complex analysis